Richlawn is a home rule-class city in eastern Jefferson County, Kentucky,  United States. The population was 415 at the 2020 United States Census. The population was 405 at the 2010 census, down from 454 at the 2000 census. It is surrounded by the larger city of St. Matthews.

Geography
U.S. Route 60 (Shelbyville Road) forms the southern boundary of the community.

Demographics

As of the census of 2000, there were 454 people, 194 households, and 135 families residing in the city. The racial makeup of the city was 96.48% White, 2.20% African American, 0.44% Native American, 0.22% Asian, 0.22% from other races, and 0.44% from two or more races. Hispanic or Latino of any race were 2.42% of the population.

There were 194 households, out of which 28.9% had children under the age of 18 living with them, 61.9% were married couples living together, 6.7% had a female householder with no husband present, and 30.4% were non-families. 26.8% of all households were made up of individuals, and 8.2% had someone living alone who was 65 years of age or older. The average household size was 2.34 and the average family size was 2.84.

In the city, the population was spread out, with 22.0% under the age of 18, 3.3% from 18 to 24, 32.4% from 25 to 44, 27.5% from 45 to 64, and 14.8% who were 65 years of age or older. The median age was 38 years. For every 100 females, there were 100.0 males. For every 100 females age 18 and over, there were 91.4 males.

The median income for a household in the city was $66,071, and the median income for a family was $75,000. Males had a median income of $52,083 versus $36,875 for females. The per capita income for the city was $29,429. None of the families and 0.4% of the population were living below the poverty line, including no under eighteens and none of those over 64.

Government
The current mayor of Richlawn is Matthew Broztege.

References

External links
City of Richlawn official website

Cities in Jefferson County, Kentucky
Cities in Kentucky